Historical Materialism is a quarterly peer-reviewed academic journal published by Brill Publishers of historical materialism, the study of society, economics, and history using a Marxist approach. The journal started as a project at the London School of Economics from 1995 to 1998. Currently it is affiliated at the SOAS the University of London. Starting from 2008 the journal organises an annual conference and a book series.

Abstracting and indexing 
The journal is abstracted in Political Science Abstracts, Sociological Abstracts, Current Contents/Social and Behavioral Sciences, Social Sciences Citation Index, Arts and Humanities Citation Index, and the Journal Citation Reports/Social Sciences Edition. According to the Journal Citation Reports, the journal has a 2020 impact factor of 0.915.

Book series 

The Historical Materialism Book Series was initiated by Brill in 2002. The series, amounting to over 200 books by 2020, includes a mix of "original monographs, translated texts and reprints of 'classics'" in Marxist theory. Paperback versions of books in the series are published by Haymarket Books.

References

External links 
 
 Historical Materialism Book Series homepage

Critical theory
Political science journals
Marxist journals
Quarterly journals
English-language journals
Publications established in 1997
Brill Publishers academic journals
1997 establishments in the United Kingdom